Nuria Martínez Prat (born February 29, 1984) is a Spanish professional basketball player for Spar CityLift Girona.

Club career 
Martínez made her debut in the Spanish top tier Liga Femenina in hometown club UB-Barça in 2002, soon signing for powerhouse CB Avenida, where she won the 2005-06 Spanish League and Cup. She played one game for WNBA team Minnesota Lynx in 2005. Martínez spent the following ten seasons mostly playing abroad in Russia (Dynamo Moscow, Turkey (Kayseri Kaski, Galatasaray S.K.) and Italy (Liomatic Umbertide, PF Schio, with just one season in Spain at Ros Casares Valencia and a second summer at Minnesota Lynx, playing 15 games in the 2010 WNBA season.

In 2017 she returned to Spain to play at Spar CityLift Girona.

WNBA career statistics

Regular season

|-
| align="left" | 2005
| align="left" | Minnesota
| 1 || 0 || 2.0 || .000 || .000 || .000 || 0.0 || 0.0 || 0.0 || 0.0 || 0.0 || 0.0
|-
| align="left" | 2010
| align="left" | Minnesota
| 15 || 0 || 8.5 || .182 || .150 || .667 || 0.7 || 0.7 || 0.3 || 0.0 || 0.8 || 1.8
|-
| align="left" | Career
| align="left" | 2 years, 1 team
| 16 || 0 || 8.1 || .176 || .143 || .667 ||| 0.7 || 0.7 || 0.3 || 0.0 || 0.8 || 1.7

National team 
She made her debut with Spain women's national basketball team at the age of 17. She played with the senior team for 15 years, from 2001 to 2015, with a total of 145 caps and 4 PPG. She participated in two Olympic Games, three World Championships and in four European Championships:
  1999 FIBA Europe Under-16 Championship (youth)
 6th 2000 FIBA Europe Under-18 Championship (youth)
 5th 2002 FIBA Europe Under-18 Championship (youth)
  2003 Eurobasket
 6th 2004 Summer Olympics
  2005 Eurobasket
 8th 2006 World Championship
  2007 Eurobasket
 5th 2008 Summer Olympics
  2010 World Championship
  2014 World Championship
  2015 Eurobasket

References

External links
 Player profile

1984 births
Living people
Abdullah Gül Üniversitesi basketball players
Basketball players at the 2004 Summer Olympics
Basketball players at the 2008 Summer Olympics
Basketball players from Catalonia
Guards (basketball)
Minnesota Lynx players
Olympic basketball players of Spain
People from Mataró
Sportspeople from the Province of Barcelona
Spanish expatriate sportspeople in Turkey
Spanish expatriate basketball people in the United States
Spanish expatriate sportspeople in Russia
Spanish expatriate sportspeople in Italy
Spanish women's basketball players